Badminton at the 2011 Southeast Asian Games were held in Istora Senayan, Jakarta, Indonesia. A total of 7 events were contested at the Senayan Sport Complex.

Medal summary

Medal table

Medalists

References 
Results

 
2011 Southeast Asian Games events
2011
2011 in badminton
Badminton tournaments in Indonesia